Ecnomia is a monotypic moth genus of the family Noctuidae. Its only species, Ecnomia hesychima, is found in Australia in Western Australia, the Northern Territory and Queensland. Both the genus and species were first described by Turner in 1936.

References

Acontiinae
Monotypic moth genera